The 15th Filmfare Awards were held in 1968, celebrating the best in Hindi cinema in 1967.

Upkar led the ceremony with 10 nominations, followed by Milan with 9 nominations.  

Upkar won 7 awards, including Best Film, Best Director (for Manoj Kumar) and Best Supporting Actor (for Pran), thus becoming the most-awarded film at the ceremony.

Main Awards

Best Film
 Upkar 
Mehrban
Milan

Best Director
 Manoj Kumar – Upkar 
A. Bhimsingh – Mehrban
A. Subba Rao – Milan

Best Actor
 Dilip Kumar – Ram Aur Shyam 
Manoj Kumar – Upkar
Sunil Dutt – Milan

Best Actress
 Nutan – Milan 
Saira Banu – Shagird
Waheeda Rehman – Ram Aur Shyam

Best Supporting Actor
 Pran – Upkar 
Ashok Kumar – Mehrban
Om Prakash – Dus Lakh

Best Supporting Actress
 Jamuna – Milan 
Mumtaz – Ram Aur Shyam
Tanuja – Jewel Thief

Best Comic Actor
 Om Prakash – Dus Lakh 
Johnny Walker – Pati Patni
Mehmood – Mehrban

Best Story
 Upkar – Manoj Kumar 
Aasra – Pratibha Bose
Mehrban – Asha Poorna Devi

Best Dialogue
 Upkar – Manoj Kumar

Best Music Director 
 Milan – Laxmikant–Pyarelal 
Hamraaz – Ravi
Upkar – Kalyanji-Anandji

Best Lyricist
 Upkar – Gulshan Bawra for Mere Desh Ki Dharti 
Hamraaz – Sahir Ludhianvi for Neele Gagan Ke Tale
Milan – Anand Bakshi for Saawan Ka Mahina

Best Playback Singer, Male
 Hamraaz – Mahendra Kapoor for Neele Gagan Ke Tale 
Upkar – Mahendra Kapoor for Mere Desh Ki Dharti
Milan – Mukesh for Saawan Ka Mahina

Best Playback Singer, Female
 Dus Lakh – Asha Bhosle for Garibon Ki Suno 
Aakhri Khat – Lata Mangeshkar for Baharon Mera Jeevan
Milan – Lata Mangeshkar for Saawan Ka Mahina

Best Art Direction, B&W
Taqdeer – H.V. Maharudria

Best Art Direction, Color
Chandan Ka Palna – Abdul Rahim

Best Cinematography, B&W
 Baharon Ke Sapne

Best Cinematography, Color
 Hamraaz

Best Sound
 Jewel Thief

Best Editing
 Upkar

Critics' Awards

Best Documentary
 India '67

Biggest Winners
Upkar – 7/10
Milan – 3/9

See also
 17th Filmfare Awards
 16th Filmfare Awards
 Filmfare Awards

References

 https://www.imdb.com/event/ev0000245/1968/

Filmfare Awards
Filmfare
1968 in Indian cinema